Warau Inu  is a Japanese sketch/variety show, akin to Saturday Night Live and MadTV, hosted by popular Japanese owarai duo, Utchan Nanchan, Outside Japan, Warau Inu is known to be the television program that produced the popular Internet meme "Yatta" by Happatai.

Japanese variety television shows
Fuji TV original programming